Mangrove Creek Dam, a concrete faced rockfill embankment dam, is the primary reservoir for water supply to residents of the Central Coast in New South Wales, Australia.

The dam was constructed between 1978 and 1982, formed by impounding the headwaters of Mangrove Creek, a tributary of the Hawkesbury River.

Dam and spillway statistics
The concrete faced rockfill embankment dam was built due to a rising demand for water from the expanding population on the Central Coast. The dam was built to boost water supply storage and to help provide a more reliable water supply. Mangrove Creek Dam was built using rolled, soft rockfill of sandstones and siltstones. This material was obtained from a quarry located within the storage area. These sandstones and siltstones were crushed and compacted to form the dam embankment. This material was incorporated into various filters and drains within the embankment to cope with seepage within the embankment and foundations.

During 1989, the Boomerang Creek Tunnel was completed. This tunnel enabled water to be transferred from Mangrove Creek Dam to Wyong River, for extraction at the Wyong River Weir for storage in Mardi Dam. This water was then extracted downstream at Lower Wyong River Weir and pumped for storage in Mardi Dam.

Catchment
Mangrove Creek Dam was proposed as a large storage dam, not primarily a collection dam.

Supply levels
Sustained low water conditions, including a 15-year drought, took the level of water to 10.27% of total capacity during February 2007, following an earlier reading of 13.3% during January 2007. Local government officials immediately placed a range of water restrictions on residents and businesses in order to conserve water and ensure ongoing supply to the region's residents and tourism industry. Piping of water from the Hunter River system augmented local water supply.

In 2007, a water plan was established and detailed a program to expand supply and reduce demand to help secure the water supply until 2050.

Between 2010 and 2012, a link was established between the Mangrove Creek Dam and Mardi Dam. This  Mardi-Mangrove Link is made up of two pipelines that enable water to be transferred from the Wyong River and Ourimbah Creek, via Mardi Dam to the large Mangrove Creek Dam for storage, instead of allowing it to flow to the ocean. It is expected that this link will help protect the Central Coast region against future extended periods of below-average rainfall.

In 2022, After days of heavy rainfall Mangrove Creek Dam reached 100% capacity and began spilling over the spillway for the first time since construction of the dam was completed in 1982.

Access and recreation
The dam is a popular day trip destination for both locals and tourists for barbecues and picnics, taking about 45 minutes to reach by car from Gosford. Restrictions apply on accessing the dam and the catchment area in order to protect water quality, protect large areas of bush land and plant and animal habitats, protect threatened plants and animal species, and preserve evidence of Aboriginal occupation.

See also

 List of dams and reservoirs in New South Wales

References

External links
  official website
 

Hawkesbury River
Dams completed in 1981
Central Coast (New South Wales)
Dams in New South Wales
Embankment dams
Central Coast Council (New South Wales)